The Duwenbeek is the largest stream on the German Baltic Sea island of Rügen. The stream originates on the northern edge of the borough of Bergen auf Rügen, flows around the Nonnensee on its eastern side and empties into the bay of Koselower See in front of the island of Ummanz and hence into the Baltic. It flows through the Rügen municipalities of Bergen auf Rügen, Parchtitz and Kluis and forms parts of the boundaries of the municipalities of Bergen, Trent and Gingst.

Renaturalisation 

On the occasion of the world fair, Expo 2000, the project "Habitats - The Duwenbeek Project" (Lebensräume - Das Duwenbeek-Projekt), which envisaged the renaturalisation of the stream, was born. Elements of this project were the reflooding of the Nonnensee, the establishment of a wetpark at the mansion in Boldevitz and a stone embankment to reduce the velocity of the stream in the reed belt of the Koselower See.

See also
List of rivers of Mecklenburg-Vorpommern

External links 
Pressemitteilung des Landkreises Rügen zum EXPO-Projekt Lebensräume - Das Duwenbeek-Projekt (dated 23 September 1999)

Rivers of Mecklenburg-Western Pomerania
Rivers of Germany